Megacraspedus binotella is a moth of the family Gelechiidae. It was described by Philogène Auguste Joseph Duponchel in 1843. It is found in Spain, Germany, Austria, Italy, the Czech Republic, Slovakia, Poland, Albania, Bosnia and Herzegovina, Bulgaria, Hungary, North Macedonia, Greece, Ukraine and Russia.

References

Moths described in 1843
Megacraspedus